The Comedy Man is a 1964 British kitchen sink realism drama film directed by Alvin Rakoff and starring Kenneth More, Cecil Parker, Dennis Price and Billie Whitelaw. It depicts the life of a struggling actor in Swinging London.

More later said that when he read the script he "was profoundly struck by its relevance to my own life, and to the lives of so many actors I had known." The film received limited distribution, being released on a double bill with Lord of the Flies (1963).

Plot
Sacked from his job in provincial rep, actor Chick Byrd moves into digs in London with Julian, a fellow actor. Julian's career soars after a successful screen test, but Chick's meets with continued failure. After the suicide of an actor friend, Jack Lavery, Chick is informed by his widow that just after Jack's death he was offered a job by Tommy Morris, an agent.

Chick contacts Tommy and takes Jack's job for a TV commercial.  Chick finally finds fame when the commercial is a hit and he's signed for a series of commercials for breath mints. Confident of his talents for the first time, but fearing he may have sold out, Chick leaves London to return to rep.

Cast
 Kenneth More - Chick Byrd
 Cecil Parker - Thomas Rutherford
 Dennis Price - Tommy Morris
 Billie Whitelaw - Judy
 Norman Rossington - Theodore Littleton
 Angela Douglas - Fay Trubshaw
 Edmund Purdom - Julian Baxter
 Frank Finlay - Prout
 Alan Dobie - Jack Lavery
 J.G. Devlin - Sloppitt
 Valerie Croft - Yvonne
 Leila Croft - Pauline
 Gerald Campion - Gerry
 Jacqueline Hill - Sandy Lavery
 Harold Goodwin - Assistant director
 Penny Morrell - Actress
 Naomi Chance - Bit part
 Guy Deghy - Schuyster
 Derek Francis - Merryweather
 Myrtle Reed - Tommy's secretary
 Edwin Richfield - Commercial director
 Gordon Rollings - Skippy
 Eileen Way - Landlady
 Freddie Mills - Indian Chief/Union steward
 Frank Thornton - Producer
 John Horsley - Co-pilot
 Wally Patch - Bar manager
 Talitha Pol - Actress at Party
 Hamilton Dyce - Burial minister
 Anthony Blackshaw - Bus conductor
 Richard Pearson - Advertising Man
 Maurice Durant - Barman
 Ronald Lacey - Assistant Director
 Jill Adams - Jan Kennedy
 Robert Raglan - Man at Party
 Alan Browning - Actor at audition

Production
Kenneth More wrote in his memoirs that he was not being offered any film scripts when he was sent this scrip by American producer Hal Chester. More later recalled,  "I read the script and was profoundly struck by its relevance to my own life, and to the lives of so many actors I had known."

More said he took the part "against the advice of my agent, my friends, everybody. I even had to put money into the film. But it was worth it."

He was married during filming and having an affair with Angela Douglas, who plays his girlfriend in the film he later left his wife to marry Douglas. More did not get along with Chester, who he felt cut important scenes from the film, but he enjoyed the role.

Filming took place in February and March 1963. More said "the public won't accept me as a stevedore or as a Liverpool truck driver, so I've been prevented until now from making a realistic subject although its something that I've been longing to do."

Critical reception
Radio Times wrote, "written by Peter Yeldham with a nice balance between irony and drama, and directed by Alvin Rakoff with an accurate eye for the dingy environments and brave bonhomie of unemployed actors, this modest British film boasts a superior cast" ; while Allmovie wrote, "matching More's terrific starring performance are such British "regulars" as Dennis Price, Billie Whitelaw, Cecil Parker, Norm Rossington, and Frank Finlay" ; and the Sunday Mirror noted, "Kenneth More in the greatest performance of his career. Brilliantly directed."

References

External links

1964 films
1964 drama films
British drama films
Films directed by Alvin Rakoff
Films based on British novels
1960s English-language films
1960s British films